Schefflerodendron is a genus of legume in the family Fabaceae. 
It contains the following species:
 Schefflerodendron usambarense

Millettieae
Taxonomy articles created by Polbot
Fabaceae genera